Thomas or Tom Dunn may refer to:

Thomas Dunn (bishop) (1870–1931), Roman Catholic bishop of Nottingham
Thomas Dunn (lieutenant-governor) (1729–1818), lieutenant governor of Canada
Thomas Dunn (musician) (1925–2008), American musician and conductor
Thomas A. Dunn (born 1942), politician and judge in Illinois
Thomas B. Dunn (1853–1924), U.S. Congressman from New York
Thomas G. Dunn (1921–1998), American Democratic Party politician and mayor of Elizabeth, New Jersey
Thomas W. Dunn (1908–1983), U.S. Army general
Thomas M. Dunn (1836–1916), American physician and politician in Virginia
Tom Dunn (golf course architect) (1849–1902), Scottish golfer, golf club maker and golf course architect
Tom Dunn (journalist) (1929–2006), New York reporter
Tom Newton Dunn (born 1973), English journalist
Tom Dunn (rugby union) (born 1992), British rugby player
Tom Dunn (umpire) (1900–1976), American baseball umpire
Tommy Dunn (1873–1938), Scottish footballer
Tommy Dunn (boxer), English boxer

See also
Thomas Dunne (disambiguation)